Gul-E-Bakawali is a pre-partition Punjabi film by D.M. Pancholi, starring Salim Raza, Noor Jehan, Suraiya, Hem Lata and Jabeen. Based on a Persian legend from the Arabian Nights, it tells the story of fairy Bakawali and a prince who wants her magical flower to cure his blind father.

Music 

The music is composed by Ghulam Haider. The playback singers includes K.L. Saigal Shamshad Begum

References 

1939 films
Indian black-and-white films
Punjabi-language Indian films
Punjabi-language Pakistani films
1930s Punjabi-language films
Indian fantasy adventure films
Films based on One Thousand and One Nights